{{Infobox settlement
| name                     = Tirukkovilur Municipality
| official_name            = 
| native_name              = Thirukovilur
| native_name_lang         = 
| other_name               = 
| nickname                 = KOVAL, Temple City
| settlement_type          = Town and Municipality
| image_skyline            = Thirukovilur temple view.jpg
| image_alt                = 
| image_caption            = Tower of Ulagalantha Perumal Temple
| pushpin_map              = India Tamil Nadu
| pushpin_label_position   = right
| pushpin_map_alt          = 
| pushpin_map_caption      = Location in Tamil Nadu, India
| coordinates              = 
| subdivision_type         = Country
| subdivision_name         = 
| subdivision_type1        = State
| subdivision_name1        = Tamil Nadu
| subdivision_type2        = District
| subdivision_name2        = Kallakurichi district
| established_title        = 
| established_date         = 
| founder                  = 
| named_for                = Temples and Heritage
| government_type          = First grade municipality
| governing_body           = Chairman
| unit_pref                = Metric
| area_footnotes           = 
| area_rank                = 
| area_total_km2           = 11.99
| elevation_footnotes      = 
| elevation_m              = 73
| population_total         = 40212
| population_as_of         = 2011
| population_rank          = 
| population_density_km2   = auto
| population_demonym       = 
| population_footnotes     = 
| demographics_type1       = Languages
| demographics1_title1     = Official
| demographics1_info1      = Tamil
| timezone1                = IST
| utc_offset1              = +5:30
| postal_code_type         = 
| postal_code              = 605757
| registration_plate       = TN-32 TN-15
| website                  = 
| footnotes                = 
}}Tirukoilur also spelt as Tirukkoyilur  or Tirukovilur is a city and the headquarters of Tirukoilur taluk in Kallakurichi District, Tamil Nadu, India. The town is located on the southern bank of  Thenpennai River and famous for Ulagalantha Perumal TempleTirukoilur is located on the highway connecting cities of Tiruvannamalai and Vellore with Southern Tamil Nadu. The town is served by Tirukoilur railway station (formerly, Arakandanallur Thirukovilur railway station).

It is of interest to note that Vanavan Mahadevi, the mother of Rajaraja Chola I, was born as a princess of Malayaman family in Tirukoilur.

Demographic
 India census, Tirukkoyilur had a population of 60212. Males constitute 49% of the population and females 51%. Tirukkoyilur has an average literacy rate of 78%, higher than the national average of 59.5%: male literacy is 83%, and female literacy is 73%. In Tirukkoyilur, 10% of the population is under 6 years of age.

Transport
Thirukoilur had widely bus facilities as both same as Rail facilities. The city well connected by State highways the major highways are below:

SH9 Cuddalore-Thirukovilur--Vellore

SH-7 Thirukoilur-Villupuram

SH-211 Thirukoilur Bye-Pass Road -Kandachipuram

SH68 Cuddalore-Thirukovilur-Sankarapuram

SH-137 Thirukoilur-Elavanasurkottai-Asanur-Trichy

MDR-1014 Thirukovilur-Manalurpet-Tiruvannamalai

MDR-812 Thirukoilur-Veerapandi-Vettavalam

MDR-784 Thirukoilur-Rishivandiyam-Thiyagadurugam-
Kallakurichi

MDR-785 Thirukoilur - Thagadi

Significance
Tirukoilur is famous for the Ulagalantha Perumal Temple . This temple has a very big raja gopuram and is the 3rd longest gopuram in tamil nadu. The statue of Vishnu is so beautiful with varnakalapam . There is a sanathi even for Vamana . As per Hindu legend, Vishnu appeared to the mudhal Alvars (first three Alvars) at Thirukkoilur. The temple plays a special part in Vaishnavism as it is where the first three Alvars sang the first three Thiruvandadhis compiled in Naalayira Divya Prabandam, the Sri Vaishnava canon. Thirumangai Alvar, another Alvar saint also revered the deity in his verses compiled in Nalayira Divya Prabandam . Ashta Veeratanams, Ashta – eight Veeratanam – Place of Bravery. As per legends, Shiva is believed to have destroyed eight different demons namely Andakasuran, Gajasuran, Jalandasuran, Thirupuradhi, Kaman, Arjunan, Dakshan and Taaragasuran. There are eight temples built signifying each of his victories in the war, and also as places where he is believed to have performed with fury. The eight temples are: Tiruvadigai Veerattaaneswarar Temple at Thiruvadigai, Tirukkovilur Veerateshwarar Temple at Tirukoilur, Veerateswarar temple at Korukkai or Thirukkurukkai, Amirtagateswarar Temple at Thirukadaiyur, Vazhuvur Verateswarar Temple at Vazhuvoor, Keelaparasalur Veerateswarar Temple at Tirupariyalur, Kandeeswarar Temple at Thirukkandiyur and Tiruvirkudi Veerataneswarar Temple at Thiruvirkudi. Shiva in all these temples are described to have used bow and arrow, trident and spear.Ulagalantha Perumal Temple or Trivikrama Temple is a Hindu temple dedicated to Vishnu located in Tirukkoyilur, Tamil Nadu, India. As per Hindu legend, Vishnu appeared to the mudhal Alvars (first three Alvars) at Thirukkoilur. The temple plays a special part in Vaishnavism as it is where the first three Alvars sang the first three Thiruvandadhis compiled in Naalayira Divya Prabandam, the Sri Vaishnava canon. Thirumangai Alvar, another Alvar saint also revered the deity in his verses compiled in Nalayira Divya Prabandam.Kabilar Kundru (or Kabilar rock) is a hill rock in the middle of the Ponnaiyar River in Tirukoilur. It is known for Tamil poet Kapilar did Vadakirrutal (fast unto death) here, after his friend Vēl Pāri was killed in a battle. It is one of the protected monuments in Tamil Nadu by the Archaeological Survey of India.Shri Raghuttama Teerthar' was one of the greatest saints of Shri Uttaradi Matha. Shri Raghuttama Teerthar entered  the Brindavana at Manampundi, near Tirukoilur

Gnananandagiri Swamigal, established his modest ashram “Sri Gnanananda Thapovanam” , which is a quiet place, situated on the northern banks of Pennar river, near Thirukovilur in Tamil Nadu. Thapovanam meaning “forest of penance” is today a place of pilgrimage.

Anecdote
While on a visit to Ceylon, the ancient female Tamil poet Avvaiyar was caught up in a torrential rain, and took shelter in the house of two women, Angavay and Sangavay. These women took care of Avvai with great kindness and promised that they will be given in marriage to the King of Tirucovalur. On hearing this the King agreed to take the women in marriage if they were given away by the Chera, Chola and the Pandya. Avvai then makes an invocation to Ganesha for making the invitation on a palmyra leaf, on which Ganesha appears before her. On receiving the invitation the three kings come for marriage and give away Angavay and Sangavay in marriage (pp. 57–59). There is a mention of this time period in Ponniyin Selvan.''

References

External links 

 http://www.thirukovalur.org (Official Devasthanam Website)
 http://www.tirukoilur.com

Cities and towns in Kallakurichi district